The 4 arrondissements of the Dordogne department are:
 Arrondissement of Bergerac, (subprefecture: Bergerac) with 130 communes. The population of the arrondissement was 102,859 in 2016.  
 Arrondissement of Nontron, (subprefecture: Nontron) with 94 communes. The population of the arrondissement was 54,758 in 2016.  
 Arrondissement of Périgueux, (prefecture of the Dordogne department: Périgueux) with 143 communes. The population of the arrondissement was 175,309 in 2016.  
 Arrondissement of Sarlat-la-Canéda, (subprefecture: Sarlat-la-Canéda) with 138 communes. The population of the arrondissement was 81,863 in 2016.

History

In 1800 the arrondissements of Périgueux, Bergerac, Nontron, Ribérac and Sarlat were established. The arrondissement of Ribérac was disbanded in 1926. 

The borders of the arrondissements of Dordogne were modified in January 2017:
 21 communes from the arrondissement of Bergerac to the arrondissement of Périgueux
 one commune from the arrondissement of Bergerac to the arrondissement of Sarlat-la-Canéda
 28 communes from the arrondissement of Périgueux to the arrondissement of Nontron
 22 communes from the arrondissement of Périgueux to the arrondissement of Sarlat-la-Canéda

References

Dordogne